Steel City Confessions is a crime novel by the American writer Thomas Lipinski set in 1990s Pittsburgh, Pennsylvania.

It tells the story of Pittsburgh private detective Carroll Dorsey, who investigates parish priest Tom Crimmins in the gunning down of man, whose wife may have been having an affair with Father Tom. Simultaneously, Dorsey becomes the target of a vendetta by Pittsburgh District Attorney Douglas Turner.

The novel is the third in a series of four Carroll Dorsey mysteries.

Sources
Contemporary Authors Online. The Gale Group, 2006.

External links
  Book Page @ Amazon.com

1999 American novels
American crime novels
Novels set in Pittsburgh
Avon (publisher) books